Qiang Du, the Fu Foundation Professor of Applied Mathematics at Columbia University, is a Chinese mathematician and computational scientist. Prior to moving to Columbia, he was the Verne M. Willaman Professor of Mathematics at Pennsylvania State University affiliated with the Pennsylvania State University Department of Mathematics and Materials Sciences.

Education
After completing his BS degree at University of Science and Technology of China in 1983, Du earned his Ph.D. degree from Carnegie Mellon University in 1988.  His thesis was written under the direction of Max D. Gunzburger.

Selected publications
His two most often cited papers are

Students and post-doctorates
As of June 2018, 17 students had completed their Ph.D. degrees under Du's supervision.  He had also supported 10 post-doctorates.

Recognition
Du was elected a fellow of the Society for Industrial and Applied Mathematics in 2013 for "contributions to applied and computational mathematics with applications in material science, computational geometry, and biology."
In 2017 he was elected as a Fellow of the American Association for the Advancement of Science.
He was elected as a Fellow of the American Mathematical Society in the 2020 Class, for "contributions to applied and computational mathematics with applications in materials science, computational geometry, and biology".

References

External links
 
 Qiang Du's home page at Columbia University
 Qiang Du's home page at Penn State

Chinese mathematicians
20th-century American mathematicians
21st-century American mathematicians
Numerical analysts
Living people
Pennsylvania State University faculty
Chinese emigrants to the United States
Fellows of the American Association for the Advancement of Science
Fellows of the American Mathematical Society
Fellows of the Society for Industrial and Applied Mathematics
Columbia University faculty
Columbia School of Engineering and Applied Science faculty
Year of birth missing (living people)